Actinochaeta amazonica is a species of tachinid flies in the genus Actinochaeta of the family Tachinidae.

Distribution
Brazil

External links

Tachininae
Insects described in 1934
Taxa named by Charles Henry Tyler Townsend
Diptera of South America